The Simba Dickie Group is a German toy manufacturer founded in 1982 as Simba Toys. The Group is the fourth largest toy manufacturer in Germany. The company's slogan is "We love to make toys".

The company's headquarters are located in Fürth with operations in Lavans-lès-Saint-Claude and Hong Kong. Over 70% of the whole turnover is generated through foreign market sales. The Simba Dickie Group has subsidiaries in 30 countries worldwide and 8 production facilities.

History
Dickie Toys was founded in 1971 by Wolfgang Sauerborn. After his death in 1993, Simba Toys took over this company.

Simba Toys was founded in 1982 by Fritz Sieber and his son Michael in Fürth. In 1984, its Hong Kong office was established.

The Simba Dickie Group was created in 1993 when the independent companies Simba Toys and Dickie Toys merged into single ownership.

Over the years the company acquired additional toy manufacturers and brands. Simba, which started with 5 employees, has about 3,000 employees in 2018.

Simba acquisitions
 1993 Dickie Toys – plastic toys
 1998 Eichhorn – wooden toys
 1999 Schuco – model cars
 2001 Noris-Spiele – creativity kits, games, and puzzles
 2004 Big – plastic toys
 2006 Nicotoy – plush animals
 2008 Smoby Toys – plastic toys and play furniture
 2008 Schipper – arts and crafts
 2010 Zoch Verlag – board games
 2010 Majorette - model cars
 2010 Solido – model cars
 2010 Heros – wooden toys
 2013 Märklin – model railways
 2019 Jada Toys – die-cast and plastic vehicles

Awards
 Product Design Award 2006 for the new Big Bobby Car

References

 
1982 establishments in West Germany
Companies based in Bavaria
Toy companies of Germany
Toy companies established in 1982
German companies established in 1982